Owen Heathcote Grierson Merton, Royal Society of British Artists (RBA) (14 May 1887–18 January 1931) was a New Zealand-born British painter, known primarily for his watercolours, landscapes, and seascapes. His work shows the influence of the Post-Impressionist representational style.

Merton was born in Christchurch, New Zealand, where he studied at the Canterbury College School of Art. He married Ruth Jenkins, an American, by whom he had two sons, the American Trappist monk and writer Thomas Merton and John Paul Merton..  (Owen Merton is described in his son Thomas' famous spiritual autobiography, The Seven Storey Mountain.) He painted in England and France until 1916, when the First World War caused him and his family to relocate with his in-laws in the vicinity of Flushing, Long Island, where he worked briefly as a landscape gardener.

After the 1921 death of his wife, Merton lived in Cape Cod, Massachusetts, then in Bermuda. Throughout his career, Merton exhibited his paintings, with varying degrees of success. After returning to Europe during 1923, was elected to the Royal Society of British Artists. He continued to travel between his birthplace of New Zealand, Europe, and the USA. He died of a brain tumour in London, England, during 1931.

Paintings by Owen Merton are on permanent display in galleries around the world, most particularly in the Museum of New Zealand.

References

External links
Web pages about Owen Merton
Gallery of Paintings by Owen Merton

20th-century British painters
British male painters
New Zealand painters
1887 births
1931 deaths
Ilam School of Fine Arts alumni
Deaths from brain cancer in England
20th-century British male artists
New Zealand emigrants to the United Kingdom